Howard Evans may refer to:

 Howard Evans (journalist) (1839–1915), British Radical and Nonconformist journalist
 Howard Ensign Evans (1919–2002), American entomologist
 Howard Evans (musician) (1944–2006), British trumpeter